Itula Mili (born April 20, 1973) is a former American football tight end. Mili played college football for Brigham Young University (BYU). He played with the Seattle Seahawks for 10 seasons.

High school
Mili attended Kahuku High School and lived in Lā'ie, Hawai'i, where he starred in football, basketball, and track. In football, he was an All-State selection. In track and field, Mili was the state high jump champion as a junior.

College career
Mili chose to attend BYU where he majored in business management. Mili played tight end and half-back for the Cougars during his football career. He began his freshman season in 1991 and was second string during Ty Detmer's Heisman Trophy season for the cougars. In 1994, his sophomore season, Mili filled in two games for the injured starter Chad Lewis. At the start of his junior season, Mili was moved to the half-back position.

During his senior year in 1996, Mili was named by the AFCA to the first-team All-American team and selected to play in both the Hula and Senior Bowl. However, he was unable to play due to surgery to repair a knee injury that was sustained during the 1996 Western Athletic Conference championship game against Wyoming. Mili finished his college career with 125 receptions for 1,763 yards and 11 touchdowns for the Cougars, along with 13 carries for 50 yards.

Professional career
He was drafted in the sixth round of the 1997 NFL draft by the Seahawks. He played on a Seahawks Super Bowl team that consisted of Walter Jones, Shaun Alexander, Matt Hasselbeck, Mack Strong, Steve Hutchinson, and fellow Samoan teammate Lofa Tatupu. On January 4, 2007, Mili was released from the Seahawks to make room for Ben Obomanu on the roster.

References

1973 births
American football tight ends
BYU Cougars football players
Living people
Seattle Seahawks players
Latter Day Saints from Hawaii
American sportspeople of Samoan descent
Players of American football from Hawaii
American Mormon missionaries in New Zealand
People from Oahu